Miles Peter Kane (born 17 March 1986) is an English musician, best known as a solo artist and the co-frontman of the Last Shadow Puppets. He was also the former frontman of the Rascals, before the band announced their break-up in August 2009.

He is currently pursuing a solo career, and continues to be a part of the Last Shadow Puppets with Arctic Monkeys frontman Alex Turner. His debut solo album, Colour of the Trap, was released on 9 May 2011 and the follow-up, Don't Forget Who You Are was released on 3 June 2013. His third solo album, Coup De Grace, was released on 10 August 2018 via Virgin EMI. His latest solo album, Change the Show, was released on 21 January 2022 through BMG Rights Management.

Early life
Born in Birkenhead, Wirral, an only child, he was raised in nearby Meols. As a child, before learning the guitar, Kane played the saxophone. Kane's maternal cousins, James and Ian Skelly, two founding members of The Coral, also had a great influence on his music taste whilst growing up.

Career

Band projects

The Little Flames
Aged 18, Kane joined The Little Flames as guitarist alongside Eva Petersen (Vocals), Greg Mighall (Drums), Joe Edwards (Bass) and Matt Gregory (Guitar) in December 2004. The band signed to Deltasonic and were compared to label mates the Coral and high-profile bands such as the Arctic Monkeys. They also went on to tour with bands like the Coral, the Zutons, the Dead 60s and the Arctic Monkeys. The band split in 2007 prior to releasing their debut album, which was eventually released in 2016.

The Rascals
Kane, on vocals and lead guitar, was joined by Greg Mighall on drums and Joe Edwards on bass guitar and occasional backing vocals. Kane took on the main songwriting duties for the band. The band, who have known each other from childhood, continued where the Little Flames left off; they signed with Deltasonic Records again, only with fewer members this time. They were adamant to keep their own distinct sound of 'awesome rockin beats' with a 'psychedelic quirk' and a 'compelling and unique dark underlying spirit'1.

The Rascals released their debut EP in December 2007, just 7 months after they got together. Entitled Out of Dreams it featured 4 tracks but did not achieve chart success. Yet they soon became tipped to be one of the bands of 2008, championed in particular by NME, following a well-received support slot on the Arctic Monkeys' 2007 tour. Their first album 'Rascalize' was released on 23 June 2008. The Rascals have a small role in the film Awaydays playing an Echo & the Bunnymen cover.

The Last Shadow Puppets: The Age Of The Understatement (2007–2008) 

Whilst touring with the Arctic Monkeys, Kane and front man Alex Turner began to experiment together backstage, which resulted in the composition of new tracks, realizing there was a future in their songwriting partnership, and the Last Shadow Puppets were born. The duo decided to travel to the West Coast of France with producer James Ford where they recorded their debut album The Age of the Understatement in just two weeks. Their album went straight to number 1 in the UK Album Charts with the single of the same name reaching number 1 in the Indie Single Charts, and subsequent singles also reaching high spots. They first played together live in the UK, doing a secret set at Glastonbury with a special guest appearance from Jack White, to whom Kane lent his iPod so White could learn the solo. The band's album missed out on the Nationwide Mercury Music Prize, but won the Mojo Breakthrough Award.
In December 2015 it was confirmed on the band's official Facebook and YouTube accounts, that the second album was due in spring 2016.

The Last Shadow Puppets: Everything You've Come To Expect (2015–2016)
After mooted rumours of a new album with Alex Turner in Kane's other band The Last Shadow Puppets. On 19 October 2015 Owen Pallett, who contributed the string arrangements on The Age of the Understatement, confirmed work on a second The Last Shadow Puppets album. In November 2015, producer James Ford confirmed that work on the second album had been completed.

On 10 January 2016, the band released their first single since 2008. The song, "Bad Habits", was accompanied with a music video filmed in the same style as the first two teaser trailers. On 21 January 2016, the band announced that their second album would be entitled Everything You've Come to Expect, and would feature the return of all three previous band members, as well as the addition of bass player Zach Dawes. The title track (Everything You've Come to Expect) was released as a single on 10 March 2016. It was followed by the release of "Aviation" on 16 March 2016 and the release of "Miracle Aligner" on 28 March 2016. The album was released on 1 April 2016.

Solo music
In early 2009, after his last tour with the Rascals, Miles Kane left the band to focus on a solo career. Inspired by a classic, smart '60s Mod theme he signed with Columbia Records and began recording his solo album with Dan Carey and Dan the Automator, who had previously worked with Gorillaz and Kasabian.

Colour of the Trap (2010–2012)

Kane's debut single, "Inhaler" was released on 22 November 2010, and he did a series of solo shows throughout November, as well as supported the Courteeners at several shows in December. He then continued solo performances in January and February 2011, before supporting Beady Eye at eight shows in March. Kane released another single, "Come Closer" on 20 February 2011, reaching No. 85 on the UK Singles Chart. "Rearrange", the third single from his debut album, was released on 27 March 2011 and reached No. 149 on the UK Singles Chart.

The album, titled Colour of the Trap, was released on 9 May 2011. One track, "My Fantasy" features backing vocals from Noel Gallagher, while another, "Happenstance" is a duet between Kane and French actress Clémence Poésy. Half of the tracks on the album were co-written by Alex Turner, Kane's partner in the Last Shadow Puppets. Kane supported the Arctic Monkeys at two shows in Sheffield in June 2011, and was their support act on their Australian tour in January 2012. It was also announced on 19 October 2011 that Kane was to support Kasabian on their UK tour in December 2011.

Don't Forget Who You Are (2013–2015)

On 24 February 2013, Kane released an EP titled Give Up, charting at No. 62. On 13 March 2013, Kane revealed he would be releasing his second album, entitled Don't Forget Who You Are, in the spring. On 19 March 2013, a UK tour in May and June to coincide with the album was announced. On 30 April 2013, Kane released the single "Don't Forget Who You Are", which features the B-side "Get Right" which was written by Kane and Alex Turner. The album was released on 3 June 2013, debuting at No. 8 in the UK charts. It was produced by Ian Broudie of The Lightning Seeds, and features two tracks co-written with Paul Weller ("Fire in My Heart" and "You're Gonna Get It").

Kane played the opening day of Glastonbury 2013 on the John Peel stage, before joining the Arctic Monkeys in their headline slot, to play on "505". Two further singles from the album, "Taking Over" and "Better Than That" were released in August and October 2013 respectively. In 2015, Kane collaborated with Mark Ronson on the opening track "Johanna" of the soundtrack to the film Mortdecai, contributing vocals.

Coup de Grace, Dr. Pepper's Jaded Hearts Club Band and Change the Show (2017–present)

In September 2017, Kane sang in a Beatles tribute band named Dr. Pepper's Jaded Hearts Club Band. Other members included Muse singer and guitarist Matt Bellamy, Nine Inch Nails drummer Ilan Rubin, and Zutons drummer Sean Payne.

In March 2018, Kane told the Evening Standard his new album would tentatively be called Coup de Grace, and would be released in the summer of 2018.

In April 2018, Kane released 'Loaded', the first single to be taken from Coup De Grace. The music video for 'Loaded', directed by Brook Linder, was released the following month.

In June 2018, Kane officially announced that Coup De Grace would be released on 10 August via Virgin EMI. The album's title track was also released the same day. The following week, Kane announced a headline European tour for October 2018. Coup De Grace contains songs co written with Jamie T and one including Lana Del Rey. Zach Dawes, Tyler Parkford and Loren Humphrey, who are live members of The Last Shadow Puppets, play on the majority of the album and also co-wrote 3 tracks with Kane.

In November 2019, Kane supported Liam Gallagher on his UK and Ireland tour.

In September 2019, Kane announced that he started recording new album and hopes to finish it by Christmas the following year.

Kane was featured on the song "Dealer", released on Lana Del Rey's eighth studio album, Blue Banisters. Kane wrote the song with Del Rey in 2017, for a planned collaborative album between Del Rey, Zach Dawes, and Kane; His vocals were uncredited on the album.

Solo band members
His current live band consist of Oscar Sholto Robertson (drums), Nathan Sudders (bass), Josh McClorey (rhythm guitar) and João de Macedo Mello (keys). His previous live bands included Victoria Smith (drums) and Dom John (guitar and keys). George Moran (rhythm guitarist), Ben Parsons (keyboard), Phil Anderson (bass guitar), and Jay Sharrock (drums). Singer-songwriter and rhythm guitarist Eugene McGuinness left the band to continue with his own career.

Personal life
Kane lived in London until August 2015, when he moved to Los Angeles, to work on the second Last Shadow Puppets record. There, he lived "seven minutes away" from friend and fellow band member, Alex Turner. In 2019, Kane relocated back to Bethnal Green.

Kane now supports Liverpool F.C., having previously followed Manchester United up until his mid 20s. He is also a close friend of former Everton and England footballer Leighton Baines. Kane is asthmatic and carries an inhaler with him whilst touring.

Public image
In 2015, he was named one of GQs 50 best dressed British men. In 2016, Kane apologised to a female journalist he offended with an “ill judged” sexual remark. Kane was promoting the latest Last Shadow Puppets album in an interview with journalist Rachel Brodsky from the SPIN music website when he asked her if she wanted to “go upstairs”.

Awards and nominations

Discography
Note: This only includes artist's solo career, not other projects such as the Last Shadow Puppets, the Rascals, The Little Flames or The Jaded Hearts Club.

Solo studio albums

EPs

Singles

References

External links

1986 births
People from Birkenhead
English rock guitarists
English male guitarists
English rock singers
English songwriters
Living people
21st-century English singers
21st-century British guitarists
21st-century British male singers
The Last Shadow Puppets members
Virgin EMI Records artists
British male songwriters